
Year 95 BC was a year of the pre-Julian Roman calendar. At the time it was known as the Year of the Consulship of Crassus and Scaevola (or, less frequently, year 659 Ab urbe condita) and the Second Year of Taishi. The denomination 95 BC for this year has been used since the early medieval period, when the Anno Domini calendar era became the prevalent method in Europe for naming years.

Events 
 By place 

 Roman Republic 
 Consuls: Lucius Licinius Crassus and Quintus Mucius Scaevola Pontifex

 Seleucid kingdom 
 Philip I Philadelphus and Antiochus XI Ephiphanes succeed as co-rulers after the deposition of Seleucus VI Epiphanes.

 Ireland 
 "Forty metre structure" at Emain Macha (near modern Armagh, Northern Ireland) built and destroyed, presumably for ritual or ceremonial purposes.

 Asia Minor 
 Tigranes the Great becomes king of Armenia

Births 
 Clodia, daughter of Appius Claudius Pulcher
 Marcus Porcius Cato Uticensis, Roman politician (d. 46 BC)

Deaths

References